The Ponsonby Ponies are a rugby league club based in Ponsonby, New Zealand. The club was founded in 1908 and was originally named Ponsonby United. The Ponies compete in the Auckland Rugby League competition and are the oldest rugby league club in NZ.

History

The 1912 Ponsonby squad included: Arthur Carlaw, Alf Chorley, Charlie Dunning, W Hooper, B Kean, Charles Webb, V Hunter, Tom Lynch, Scotch MacDonald, Harry Oakley, M Stanaway, Syd Riley, Billy Tyler and J Warner.

The Ponsonby United side which won the 1929 Auckland Rugby League championship. The club was founded in August 1908 by two returning All Golds, Billy Tyler and Charlie Dunning.

In 1930 Ponsonby celebrated their 21st anniversary with a social on October 13 at the Druids Hall.

In 1920 Ponsonby won the Thacker Shield.

1952 saw the club win the "treble" of the Fox Memorial, Roope Rooster and Stormont Shield all in one year. This feat was to be repeated in 1972.

In 1979 the club merged with Maritime to form Ponsonby-Maritime however this merger only lasted until 1983. They were relegated in 1992, and have not regained a position in the first division since then.

The club celebrated its centenary in 2008.

In 2015 the Ponies entered back into the Sharman Cup & the rebuild began with a number of former players returning. 2017 was a great season for the Ponsonby Ponies with an outstanding team of former juniors assembled during pre season under coach John Mana. A new committee & chairman was voted in, giving a breath of fresh air into the club.

Following the 2019 season, Auckland Rugby League denied the club entry to its competitive men's competitions indefinitely, citing the clubs inability to meet competitive criteria, despite Ponsonby making the playoffs in 2017 and 2018.

The 2020 season saw the club denied entry to field a male team in any Auckland competitive senior grade competition by ARL, though they did send a team to play the Kia Toa Tigers in Dunedin as a display of its ability to field a competitive team. Otago being the only league welcoming of the clubs attempts to play competitive matches.

Following this, Ponsonby formally entered a men's premier team in the 2021 Otago Rugby League Premiership, travelling to play all games in Otago between Dunedin and Oamaru. A mammoth undertaking for the club which displayed its desire to play competitive games, despite adversity.

Ponsonby won the 2021 Otago Rugby League Minor Premiership, before COVID-19 prevented their ability to travel and participate in the scheduled Grand Final against Otago University, who Ponsonby had defeated earlier in the season.

In 2022 they are fielding a team in the premier grade after several years of negotiations with Auckland Rugby League. Ponsonby were supported in their application by Glenfield, who offered to play in the reserve grade, allowing Ponsonby to compete in the Fox Memorial competition and return to competitive football in Auckland.

Notable players
Between the years 1909 and 1986 Ponsonby developed 44 players that gained New Zealand representative status. Brackets indicates the year that they first represented New Zealand.

Arthur Carlaw (1909)
Ronald Amelioran MacDonald (1910)
Alfred Chorley (1910)
Charles Dunning (1910)
Charles Savory (1911)
Arthur Hardgrave (1912)
Charles Albert Edward Webb (1912)
James Clark (1913)
Thomas Allen McClymont (1919)
Arthur Matthews (1919)
Horace Neal (1919) 
Samuel Arthur Lowrie (1919)
Bill Walsh (1919)
Frank August Delgrosso (1921)
Joe Meadows (1921)
Ivan Littlewood (1925)
Hector Cole (1926)
George Gardiner (1926)
Lou Hutt (1928) 
Tim Peckham (1928)
Arthur Kay (1933)
Brian Riley (1935)
Frank Halloran (1937)
Travers Hardwick (1946)
Len Jordan (1946)
Roy Nurse (1946)
Des White (1950)
Douglas Richards-Jolley (1951)
Bill Sorensen (1951)
Joe Ratima (1952)
Len Eriksen (1954)
Rex Percy (1955)
Keith Bell (1957)
Bill Snowden (1959)
Roger Bailey (1961)
Jack Fagan (1961)
Brian Lee (1961)
Graham Mattson (1964)
Ricky Carey (1967)
Don Mann (1971)
John O'Sullivan (1971)
Brian Tracey (1972)
Wayne Robertson (1974)
Tom Conroy (1975)
Joe Ropati (1986)

Club titles

Ponsonby grade championships (1910-1943)
 1912 Second Grade and Third Grade
 1913 Second Grade and Third Grade
 1914 Third Grade
 1917 First Grade (Myers Cup) and Second Grade
 1918 First Grade (Myers Cup)
 1919 First Grade (Myers Cup) and Sixth Grade
 1920 Sixth Grade
 1921 Sixth Grade B
 1922 Third Grade
 1923 Third Grade and Sixth Grade A
 1924 Fourth Grade and Fifth Grade
 1926 First Grade (Monteith Shield)
 1929 First Grade (Monteith Shield)
 1930 First Grade (Monteith Shield) and Third Grade
 1932 Third Grade
 1935 Third Grade
 1938 Sixth Grade and Schoolboys (Juniors)

Ponsonby Senior Team Records (1910-1943 + 2022)
The season record for the most senior men's team in the club.

Top point scorers (1909-1944)
The point scoring lists are compiled from matches played in the first grade championship, Roope Rooster, Phelan Shield and Stormont Shield matches which involved all first grade sides. It does not include additional one off type matches such as those against non-Auckland teams or charity matches. Frank Delgrosso played several additional matches for Ponsonby so his actual points scored for the club was at least 767. George Gardiner scored 220 points from 89 games.

Gallery

References

External links
 Official Website

 
Auckland rugby league clubs
Rugby clubs established in 1908
1908 establishments in New Zealand